General George T. Babbitt (born June 22, 1942) is a retired United States Air Force four-star general who served as Commander, Air Force Materiel Command (COMAFMC), from 1997 to 2000.

As a teenager in 1959, Babbitt joined the Ventures rock group, just before the band gained fame with their huge hit "Walk Don't Run" in 1960. Babbitt had to drop out because he was not old enough to play the nightclubs and bars the band was beginning to work in.

Babbitt was commissioned in 1965 through the Reserve Officer Training Corps program at the University of Washington. He trained as an aircraft maintenance officer and served as officer in charge of fighter flight lines in the United States, the Pacific and Europe. He twice commanded aircraft maintenance squadrons and was deputy commander for maintenance of a European F-15 wing.

Prior to assuming command of Air Force Materiel Command, Babbitt was director of the Defense Logistics Agency at Fort Belvoir, Virginia. Other assignments include deputy chief of staff for logistics, Headquarters U.S. Air Force; deputy director for materiel management, Defense Logistics Agency; director of supply, Headquarters U.S. Air Force, and director of logistics for both Headquarters Air Training Command and Headquarters U.S. Air Forces in Europe.

On March 1, 1998, while on active duty as 4-star general, he played live in uniform on drums with the Ventures.

Education
1965 Bachelor of Science degree in mechanical engineering, University of Washington, Seattle
1970 Master of Science degree in logistics management, Air Force Institute of Technology, Wright-Patterson Air Force Base, Ohio
1975 Program Managers Course, Defense Systems Management College, Fort Belvoir, Virginia
1978 Armed Forces Staff College, Norfolk, Virginia
1986 Air War College, Maxwell Air Force Base, Alabama
1989 The Executive Development Program, Kellogg School of Business, Northwestern University, Illinois
1993 Program for Senior Managers in Government, John F. Kennedy School of Government, Harvard University, Massachusetts

Assignments
June 1965 – February 1966, student, aircraft maintenance officer course, Chanute Air Force Base, Illinois
February 1966 – June 1969, RF-4C maintenance officer, RAF Alconbury, England
June 1969 – September 1970, student, Air Force Institute of Technology, Wright-Patterson Air Force Base, Ohio
September 1970 – September 1971, squadron maintenance officer, 12th Tactical Reconnaissance Squadron, Tan Son Nhut Air Base, South Vietnam
September 1971 – August 1973, maintenance planner, B-1A System Program Office, Rockwell International, Los Angeles
August 1973 – January 1976, support equipment and spares manager, B-1A System Program Office, Wright-Patterson Air Force Base, Ohio
January 1976 – January 1978, deputy program manager for logistics, Precision Location Strike System Program Office, Wright-Patterson Air Force Base, Ohio
January 1978 – July 1978, student, Armed Forces Staff College, Norfolk, Virginia
July 1978 – August 1980, maintenance officer and later, commander, 1st Aircraft Generation Squadron, Langley Air Force Base, Virginia
August 1980 – September 1981, commander, 36th Aircraft Generation Squadron, Bitburg Air Base, West Germany
September 1981 – July 1985, assistant deputy commander for maintenance and later, deputy commander for maintenance, 36th Tactical Fighter Wing, Bitburg Air Base, West Germany
July 1985 – June 1986, student, Air War College, Maxwell Air Force Base, Alabama
June 1986 – June 1990, division chief and later, deputy director of logistics plans and programs, Headquarters U.S. Air Force, Washington, D.C.
June 1990 – July 1992, director, logistics, Headquarters Air Training Command, Randolph Air Force Base, Texas
July 1992 – June 1993, director, logistics, Headquarters U.S. Air Forces in Europe, Ramstein Air Base, Germany
June 1993 – March 1994, director of supply, Headquarters U.S. Air Force, Washington, D.C.
April 1994 – June 1995, deputy director of materiel management, Defense Logistics Agency, Alexandria, Virginia
June 1995 – October 1996, deputy chief of staff for logistics, Headquarters U.S. Air Force, Washington, D.C.
October 1996 – May 1997, director, Defense Logistics Agency, Fort Belvoir, Virginia
May 1997 – 2000, commander, Air Force Materiel Command, Wright-Patterson Air Force Base, Ohio

Major awards and decorations
  Air Force Distinguished Service Medal
  Defense Superior Service Medal
  Legion of Merit
  Bronze Star
  Meritorious Service Medal
  Air Force Commendation Medal
  Vietnam Service Medal with three service stars
  Republic of Vietnam Gallantry Cross Unit Citation

Effective dates of promotion
Second lieutenant March 19, 1965
First lieutenant November 30, 1966
Captain June 12, 1968
Major February 1, 1975
Lieutenant colonel November 1, 1979
Colonel August 1, 1984
Brigadier general September 1, 1990
Major general July 1, 1993
Lieutenant general July 1, 1995
General June 1, 1997

References

Notes

1942 births
Living people
United States Air Force generals
Recipients of the Legion of Merit
University of Washington College of Engineering alumni
Air Force Institute of Technology alumni
United States Air Force personnel of the Vietnam War
Harvard Kennedy School alumni
Recipients of the Air Force Distinguished Service Medal
Recipients of the Order of the Sword (United States)
Recipients of the Defense Superior Service Medal
American expatriates in the United Kingdom
American expatriates in Germany
The Ventures members